The Grantham-Edwards-McComb House is a historic house at 217 Park Avenue in New Castle, Delaware.  It is a -story Federal style brick building with a side gable roof, end chimneys, and a five bay facade.  It was built between 1804 and 1817 by Isaac Grantham, and was probably used as a tenant farm in its early years.  After the American Civil War it was acquired by Henry S. McComb, a Civil War veteran who later was a cofounder of the Union Pacific Railroad.

The house was added to the National Register of Historic Places in 2016.

See also
National Register of Historic Places listings in northern New Castle County, Delaware

References

Houses on the National Register of Historic Places in Delaware
Houses completed in 1817
Houses in New Castle County, Delaware
National Register of Historic Places in New Castle County, Delaware